Robert Brown Asprey (February 16, 1923 – January 26, 2009) was an American military historian and author, noted for his books on military history published between 1959 and 2001.

Biography
Asprey was born in Sioux City, Iowa, to Gladys Brown Asprey and Peter Asprey Jr.  
He had an older brother and sister, actinide and fluorine chemist Larned B. Asprey (1919–2005), a signer of the Szilárd petition, and mathematician and computer scientist Winifred Asprey (1917–2007), founder of Vassar College's computer science department.

In World War II, Asprey was a member of the secret Marine Beach Jumper Unit, then joined the 5th Marine Division.

In 1949, Asprey received his BA (honors) in English and modern history from the University of Iowa. From 1949 to 1950, he was a Fulbright Scholar at New College, Oxford University. From 1955 to 1957, he studied at the University of Vienna. From 1968 to 1972, he was a researcher at New College. In 1974, he attended the University of Nice.

In the 1950s, he served in U.S. Army Intelligence in Austria before returning to the Marine Corps in the Korean War with the rank of captain. He received a Purple Heart and a Presidential Unit Citation for his service.

In 2004, he moved from Spain to Sarasota, Florida. From 2005, he was a research scholar at New College of Florida.

War in the Shadows: The Guerrilla in History

Perhaps Asprey's most famous book is the monumental War in the Shadows: The Guerrilla in History, a sweeping 2500-year survey on the subject, with particular emphasis on the Vietnam War and the other guerrilla wars of the 20th century, including the underground actions that took place during conventional wars, from T.E. Lawrence of Arabia in World War I to Mao Zedong before, during, and after World War II .

Originally released in two volumes in 1975, the book was revised and abridged in 1994 as a single-volume second edition. Chapters were added later covering the end of the Vietnam War and other guerrilla conflicts since the book's original version.

Works

References

1923 births
2009 deaths
American military historians
United States Army personnel of World War II
United States Marine Corps personnel of the Korean War
University of Iowa alumni
Alumni of New College, Oxford
University of Vienna alumni
Côte d'Azur University alumni
United States Marines
Writers from Sioux City, Iowa
Historians from Iowa